The coat of arms of Winnipeg is the full armorial achievement as used by the municipal government as an official symbol. This arms was granted in 1972 by the College of Arms in England and replaced an early coat of arms. Two versions are used, the full coat of arms, and a lesser version called the "City Crest".

The coat of arms was used to create the Flag of Winnipeg in 1975.

References

Winnipeg
Municipal government of Winnipeg
Winnipeg